Mabel Elsworth Todd (1880 – 1956) is known as the founder of what came to be known as 'Ideokinesis', a form of somatic education that became popular in the 1930s amongst dancers and health professionals. Todd's ideas involved using anatomically based, creative visual imagery and consciously relaxed volition to create and refine neuromuscular coordination. Lulu Sweigard, who coined the term Ideokinesis, and Barbara Clark furthered Todd's work.

Todd's work was published in her book 'The Thinking Body' (1937), which is now considered by modern dance schools to be a classic study of physiology and the psychology of movement.  Her work influenced many somatic awareness professionals of her day, and is often cited along with the Feldenkrais method and Body-Mind Centering for its focus on the subtle influence of unconscious intention and attention.

Publications 

 Todd, M. Early Writings, 1920-1934. Reprint. New York: Dance Horizons.
 Todd M. The Thinking Body. 1937. Reprint. New York: Dance Horizons. 
 Todd M. The Hidden You. Reprint. New York: Dance Horizons, 1953.

References

Exercise instructors
Creative arts therapies
Dance writers
1880 births
1956 deaths
Somatic therapists
Burials at Oakwood Cemetery (Syracuse, New York)